The Stade Yves-du-Manoir (officially Stade olympique Yves-du-Manoir, also known as the Stade olympique de Colombes, or simply Colombes to the locals) is a rugby, track and association football stadium in Colombes, near Paris, France.

History 

Named in memory of French rugby player Yves du Manoir in 1928, it was the main stadium for the 1924 Summer Olympics and had a capacity of 45,000 at the time. During the 1924 games, it hosted the athletics, some of the cycling, some of the horse riding, gymnastics, tennis, some of the football, rugby, and two of the modern pentathlon events (running, fencing). 

It was later expanded to a capacity of over 60,000. Colombes was also the venue for the 1938 World Cup Final between Italy and Hungary, and also hosted the home team's two matches in the tournament. 

Colombes hosted a number of French Cup finals and home games of the national football and national rugby union teams into the 1970s. It remained the nation's largest capacity stadium until the renovated Parc des Princes was inaugurated in 1972. The Colombes' capacity had dropped to under 50,000 due to increasingly stringent safety regulations. The last games of the national rugby union and football teams at Colombes were respectively in 1972 and 1975. 

France professional football team RC Paris used Colombes as their home ground until about 1985, then moved on to other stadia before coming back in the 2010s. Unlike RC Paris, Racing 92 rugby did not leave Colombes until November 2017. They originally planned to redevelop Yves-du-Manoir into a stadium to be shared with Racing Club de France Football, but instead built Paris La Défense Arena in nearby Nanterre, playing their first match in the new venue in December 2017. It remains to be seen whether the Racing Club de France football club will move as well.

It is slated to be a field hockey venue for the 2024 Summer Olympics.

1938 FIFA World Cup
Stade Olympique Yves-du-Manoir hosted three games of the 1938 FIFA World Cup, including the final.

In popular culture 
The Olympic races involving Harold Abrahams and Eric Liddell which are portrayed in the film Chariots of Fire were run here, although the stadium was not used for the film.

The stadium was portrayed in the 1981 film Escape to Victory starring Sylvester Stallone and Michael Caine, but the stand-stadium used in the filming was the Hungária körúti stadion in Budapest, Hungary.

References

External links

 Colombes Stadium Yves-du-Manoir in postal card (in French)
 History of the Olympic Stadium (in French)
 Article: Chariots of Fire stadium reprieved

———

Venues of the 1924 Summer Olympics
Venues of the 2024 Summer Olympics
Paris
Olympic athletics venues
Olympic equestrian venues
Olympic fencing venues
Olympic football venues
Olympic gymnastics venues
Olympic modern pentathlon venues
Olympic tennis venues
Olympic field hockey venues
1938 FIFA World Cup stadiums
Athletics (track and field) venues in France
Sports venues in Hauts-de-Seine
Football venues in France
Racing Club de France Football
Rugby union stadiums in France
Racing Club de France
Racing 92
Olympic cycling venues
Olympic rugby union venues
Multi-purpose stadiums in France
Sports venues completed in 1907
1907 establishments in France